Results from Norwegian football (soccer) in the year 1911.

Class A of local association leagues
Class A of local association leagues (kretsserier) is the predecessor of a national league competition. The champions qualify for the 1911 Norwegian cup.

Norwegian Cup

First round

|colspan="3" style="background-color:#97DEFF"|1911

The rest of the teams had a walkover.

Second round

|colspan="3" style="background-color:#97DEFF"|19 September 1911

Semi-finals

|colspan="3" style="background-color:#97DEFF"|1 October 1911

Final

National team

Sources:

References

External links
 RSSSF Norway

 
Seasons in Norwegian football